Tom Kočevar-Dešman (born 10 July 1990) is an inactive Slovenian tennis player.

Kočevar-Dešman has a career high ATP singles ranking of 349 achieved on 17 August 2015. He also has a career high ATP doubles ranking of 514 achieved on 22 September 2014.

Playing for Slovenia in Davis Cup, Kočevar-Dešman has a W/L record of 1–8.

External links
 
 
 

1990 births
Living people
Slovenian male tennis players
Sportspeople from Ljubljana